Iwo Jima may refer to:

Places
Iwo Jima, a volcanic island in Japan's Ogasawara Islands chain, now officially called Iōtō in Japanese, that was the scene of the Battle of Iwo Jima (see below) in World War II. Today it belongs to Tokyo, Japan.
Iōjima, Kagoshima, another volcanic island, also known as Satsuma Iōjima and located in the Satsunan Shotō, an island group south of Kyūshū, Japan.
Iōjima, Nagasaki, a former town in Nagasaki Prefecture, Japan.

Events 
 Battle of Iwo Jima, fought by the United States of America and the Empire of Japan in February and March 1945
 List of Medal of Honor recipients: World War II: Iwo Jima
 :Category:Battle of Iwo Jima
 Raising the Flag on Iwo Jima, the events that led up to a photograph on February 23, 1945, of the second flag raising on Iwo Jima that won a Pulitzer Prize and became the inspiration for stamps, statues, and paintings
 USMC War Memorial, also known as the Iwo Jima Memorial

Books
Iwo Jima: Legacy of Valor, 1986 book by Bill Ross
Iwo Jima: Portrait of a Battle: United States Marines at War in the Pacific, 2006 book by  Eric Hammel
Flags Of Our Fathers, 2000 book by James Bradly and Ron Powers

Movies & other media 
 Letters from Iwo Jima, 2006 Golden Globe- and Academy Award-winning war film directed by Clint Eastwood
 Raising the Flag on Iwo Jima, a historic photograph taken on February 23, 1945, by Joe Rosenthal
 Sands of Iwo Jima, 1949 war film which follows a group of Marines from training to the Battle of Iwo Jima during World War II
 To the Shores of Iwo Jima, a 1945 short war film produced by the U.S. Navy and U.S. Marine Corps, documenting the Battle of Iwo Jima
 Flags of Our Fathers (film), 2006 American war film. It is directed by Clint Eastwood.  Written by William Broyles, Jr. and Paul Haggis. It is based from the book Flags of Our Fathers
 Iwo Jima (video game), a 1986 strategy video game released by Personal Software Services for home computers

Military equipment 
 Iwo Jima-class amphibious assault ship, helicopter landing platform ships (LPH) of the United States Navy
 :Category:Iwo Jima-class amphibious assault ships
 Iwo Jima LORAN-C transmitter, a former LORAN-C transmitter at Iwo Jima, Japan
 USS Iwo Jima (CV-46), a Ticonderoga-class aircraft carrier, construction canceled August 12, 1945
 USS Iwo Jima (LPH-2), an amphibious assault ship, launched September 17, 1960
 USS Iwo Jima (LHD-7), a Wasp-class amphibious assault ship, launched on February 4, 2000

See also
Iōjima (disambiguation)

ja:硫黄島